Alexander Brott, born Joël Brod (March 14, 1915April 1, 2005), was a Canadian conductor, composer, violinist and music teacher.

Early life and education
Brott was born in Montreal, Quebec. He earned degrees from the Schulich School of Music at McGill University and the Juilliard School. Among his teachers were Albert Chamberland and Alfred Whitehead.

Career
Brott began his career as a concert violinist in the 1930s. He joined the faculty at McGill University in 1939, where he taught orchestration and music history. He founded and directed the McGill Chamber Orchestra. His work was also part of the music event in the art competition at the 1948 Summer Olympics.

Brott was leader of the Montreal Orchestra, Les Concerts symphoniques de Montréal and the Montreal Symphony Orchestra from 1945 to 1958. In 1939, he joined the Faculty of Music at McGill University, where he remained until 1980. His compositions included Arabesque, Circle, Triangle, 4 Squares, and Paraphrase in Polyphony. He was also the founder and musical director of the McGill Chamber Orchestra.  He also conducted the Kingston Symphony from 1965 to 1981.

In 1967, he conducted the McGill Chamber Orchestra at the official opening of the Centennial Theatre at Bishop's University in Lennoxville, Quebec, Canada.

In 1979 he was made a Member of the Order of Canada and in 1988 he was made a Knight of the National Order of Quebec. He retired from his position as professor and head of the department of orchestral instruments at McGill in 1980.

His memoirs, Alexander Brott: My Lives in Music (with co-writer Betty Nygaard King), were published by Mosaic Press in 2005.

He died in Montreal in 2005 at the age of 90. That year an album of recordings of his compositions, including his  1950 "Violin Concerto" and 1957 "Arabesque for cello and orchestra", with soloists Angèle Dubeau and Denis Brott. Also included were "Seven Minuets and Six Canons" (1971) and "Paraphrase in Polyphony" (1967).

Personal life
Brott's wife Lotte was an accomplished cellist. Their sons are Boris Brott, a conductor, and Denis Brott, a cellist and conductor.

Publications
Alexander Brott: My Lives in Music.  By Alexander Brott and Betty Nygaard King.  Oakville, Ont.: Mosaic Press, 2005. xiii, 228 p., ill. .

References

External links
 AlexanderBrott.ca
 Alexander Brott at The Canadian Encyclopedia

1915 births
2005 deaths
Members of the Order of Canada
Knights of the National Order of Quebec
Composers awarded knighthoods
Conductors (music) awarded knighthoods
Musicians awarded knighthoods
Academic staff of McGill University
McGill University School of Music alumni
Queen's University at Kingston alumni
Juilliard School alumni
20th-century classical composers
Canadian educators
Canadian classical composers
Male conductors (music)
Canadian classical violinists
Male classical violinists
Musicians from Montreal
Canadian male classical composers
20th-century classical violinists
20th-century Canadian composers
20th-century Canadian conductors (music)
20th-century Canadian male musicians
Olympic competitors in art competitions
20th-century Canadian violinists and fiddlers
Canadian male violinists and fiddlers